Suhor may refer to:

Places

Slovenia 
 Suhor, Novo Mesto, Novo Mesto
 Suhor, Metlika:
 Dolnji Suhor pri Metliki, Metlika 
 Gornji Suhor pri Metliki, Metlika
 Suhor pri Dolenjskih Toplicah, Dolenjske Toplice
 Suhor, Kostel

Croatia 
 Suhor, Croatia, a former village near Delnice

People 
 David Suhor (born 1968), American jazz musician and teacher
 Yvonne Suhor (1961-2018), American actress